Kimia is a genus of mosquitoes found in eastern Asia.

The genus includes the following species:

Kimia decorabilis (Leicester, 1908)
Kimia imitata (Baisas, 1946)
Kimia miyagii (Toma & Mogi, 2003)
Kimia nemorosa (Gong, 1996)
Kimia suchariti (Miyagi & Toma, 1989)

References

Insects described in 2007
Culicinae
Mosquito genera